Behind Closed Doors is a 2022 Russian crime drama film directed by Anton Maslov.

Plot 
The film is about a firefighter named Anton Kalashnikov who is raising a 14-year-old daughter. She goes to dances and every Saturday he meets her, after which he watches TV with her and has dinner. But one Saturday things turned out differently. She rings the intercom and Anton opens the door, but she doesn't get up.

Cast 
 Darya Shcherbakova as Kira Kalashnikova
 Denis Nikiforov as Anton Kalashnikov, Kira's father
 Natalya Shvets as Viktoria "Vika" Kalashnikova, Kira's mother
 Yevgeny Antropov as Vanya
 Natalya Zemtsova as Masha, Vanya's sister
 Tatyana Dogileva as Tamara, the eldest at the entrance
 Mariya Karpova as Olya Petrova, a neighbor from 182 apartments
 Andrey Shibarshin as Petrov, a neighbor from 182 apartments
 Dmitry Lysenkov as Artur, a neighbor from 165 apartments
 Azamat Nigmanov as Jora, a neighbor from 175 apartments
 Pavel Vorozhtsov as a Family man, a neighbor from 178 apartments
 Artur Vakha as an elevator operator, CCTV operator
 Nikolay Shrayber as Stepan
 Nikoletta Shonus as Natasha Dryagina, Kira's best friend
 Anna Kotova as Natasha's mother, a neighbor from 155 apartments
 Mikhail Zhigalov as Fyodor

References

External links 
 

2022 films
2020s Russian-language films
2022 crime drama films
2022 crime thriller films
Russian crime drama films
Russian crime thriller films